Sophie Chang and Angela Kulikov were the defending champions but chose not to participate.

Elvina Kalieva and Peyton Stearns won the title, defeating Allura and Maribella Zamarripa in the final, 7–6(7–5), 7–6(7–5).

Seeds

Draw

Draw

References

External Links
Main Draw

Berkeley Tennis Club Challenge - Doubles